"Nothing New" is a song by American singer-songwriter Taylor Swift featuring American singer-songwriter Phoebe Bridgers. Swift wrote the song in March 2012 and produced it with Aaron Dessner for her second re-recorded studio album, Red (Taylor's Version), which was released in 2021 through Republic Records.

A guitar-led folk and alternative rock song, "Nothing New" is about anxieties over romance and growing up. Music critics interpreted the song as Swift's message about the music industry's treatment of female musicians, and lauded the track for its production, songwriting, and the vocal chemistry between Swift and Bridgers. After Red (Taylor's Version) was released, the song reached the top 40 on singles charts of Australia, Canada, and Ireland. It peaked at number 43 on the US Billboard Hot 100.

Background and release

Taylor Swift's fourth studio album Red was released in 2012 by Big Machine Records. It combines country and pop with many genres, prompting media debate over Swift's status as a country artist. The album was a critical success, ranking at number 99 on Rolling Stone 2020 revision of the 500 Greatest Albums of All Time. By June 2021, it had sold over 4.4 million copies in the United States.

Swift signed with Republic Records after her contract with Big Machine expired in 2018; the contract granted her rights to the master recordings of her music. In 2019, Big Machine, as well as the master recordings of Swift's first six studio albums, were acquired by businessman Scooter Braun. Swift began re-recording her Big Machine albums in November 2020, as a means to own her master recordings. The first re-recorded album, Fearless (Taylor's Version), the re-recording of Swift's 2008 album, was released on April 9, 2021.

Swift released her second re-recorded album Red (Taylor's Version), the re-recording of the 2012 album, on November 12, 2021. In addition to the original Red tracks, Red (Taylor's Version) features nine unreleased "from the Vault" tracks—including "Nothing New". Swift wrote "Nothing New" on an Appalachian dulcimer in March 2012 when she was 22 years old. She later approached Phoebe Bridgers to feature vocals on the track for Red (Taylor's Version).

Music and lyrics

"Nothing New" was produced by Swift and Aaron Dessner, the latter who recorded the instruments at his Long Pond Studio in New York. Swift's vocals were recorded by Christopher Rowe at Kitty Committee Studio in Belfast, and Bridgers's were recorded by Will Maclellan at Sound City Studios in Van Nuys. The song is a melancholic guitar-led alternative rock and folk ballad, featuring understated cello and violin. Written by Swift, the track is about anxiety over romance and growing up. In the chorus, Swift sings, "How can a person know everything at 18 but nothing at 22?" reflecting on her growing up, and "Will you still want me when I'm nothing new?" In the views of Olivia Horn from Pitchfork, "Nothing New" is not only about romantic anxieties, but also about "the music business' famously fickle relationship to young women". Laura Snapes from The Guardian agreed with this idea, citing the lyric "People love an ingenue" as Swift's internalized pressure to stay in the public eye. In a journal entry dated March 2, 2012, Swift wrote that the song is about "being scared of aging and things changing and losing what you have".

Reception
"Nothing New" was lauded by music critics. Horn, Snapes, and Bobby Olivier of Spin deemed the track one of the album's highlights, noting the thoughtful lyrics and Swift's double entendre message about the music industry. In The New York Times, Lindsay Zoladz praised Bridgers's guest appearance and the songwriting, deeming it one of the best "from the Vault" tracks. Angie Martoccio of Rolling Stone lauded the track's production: "Swift's adult voice combines with Bridgers' honey-soaked, hushed vocals, melding together in an autumn rush that brushes against your cheek."

The A.V. Club editor Saloni Gajjar picked "Nothing New" as the "most magnetic" among the unreleased tracks, highlighting its double-meaning message. Jason Lipshutz of Billboard complimented Bridgers's appearance and the lyrics. In Variety, Chris Willman gave the track a five-out-of-five rating, praising Bridgers's vocals and Swift's thoughtful songwriting. The New Yorker Carrie Battan compared "Nothing New" to the "folksy poeticism" of Swift's 2020 albums Folklore and Evermore. In the Los Angeles Times, Mikael Wood deemed it the best "from the Vault" track, highlighting its double entendre lyrics and nostalgic sentiments during the age of internet culture.

After Red (Taylor's Version) was released, "Nothing New" debuted at number 43 on the US Billboard Hot 100 chart dated November 27, 2021. It peaked at number 11 on the Hot Country Songs chart. The track reached the top 40 on singles charts of Australia (31), Canada (22), and Ireland (25). On the Global 200 chart compiled by Billboard, "Nothing New" peaked at number 33.

Credits and personnel
Credits adapted from Red (Taylor's Version) album liner notes

 Taylor Swift – lead vocals, songwriter, producer
 Phoebe Bridgers – lead vocals
 Aaron Dessner – producer, recording engineer, acoustic guitar, bass guitar, guitar, keyboard, piano, synthesizers
 Tony Berg – vocal producer
 Bella Blasko – recording engineer
 Bryce Dessner – orchestrator
 Clarice Jensen – cello, cello recording
 Jonathan Low – recording engineer, mixer
 Christopher Rowe – vocal recording
 Will Maclellan – vocal recording
 Kyle Resnick – violin recording
 Yuki Numata Resnick – violin

Charts

Notes

References

Journal
 

2021 songs
Taylor Swift songs
Phoebe Bridgers songs
Songs written by Taylor Swift
Song recordings produced by Taylor Swift
Song recordings produced by Aaron Dessner
American folk songs
Female vocal duets